Parliamentary groups in Spain are the union of members of parliament who may or may not belong to the same political party, but with the same or similar political ideology. The figure of the parliamentary group is common to the Cortes Generales, the national parliament of Spain, and the regional legislatures.

There is not a unified regulation on what the requirements are to form a parliamentary group. In the case of the national parliament, each House possess their own standing rules establishing the requirements. As common aspects, the senators or deputies that do not belong to a parliamentary group are integrated in the Mixed Group. Also, the groups are represented by an Spokesperson (that may be or not the leader of the political party).

National legislature

Senate
According to the Standing Orders of the Senate, the Senate's parliamentary groups needs a minimum of 10 senators to be formed and during the term of the legislature, this number can not go below 6 senators. In this case, the group would be dissolved(II § 27).

Each group can freely chose their name (II § 27) and they have to present before the Bureau of the Senate in the five days after the constitutive session the request in which they must to indicate which senators will form part of the parliamentary group. In the case of regional senators (appointed by the regional legislatures), they have five days since the appointment to integrate in one of the parliamentary groups (II § 28).

The Senate's parliamentary groups are subdivided in Territorial Groups. These groups are formed by a minimum of 3 senators belonging to specific constituencies (II § 32).

As of December 2019, in the 14th Senate, these are the Senate' parliamentary groups:

Congress of Deputies
The Congress of Deputies is the lower house of the Cortes Generales and the strongest of both houses. The requirements to form a parliamentary group in Congress are more complex (II § 23):
 The parliamentary groups needs a minimum of 15 MPs.
 In the case of not having 15 MPs, the parliamentary groups with no less than 5 MPs with a 5% of the national vote or a 15% of vote in their constituency, can form a parliamentary group.

As in the Senate, the parliamentary groups have to be formed within the five days after the constitutive session of the House and they need the approval of the Bureau of the Congress (II § 24).

As of December 2019, in the 14th Cortes Generales, these are the Congress' parliamentary groups:

References

Notes
The parliamentary groups are divided according to political parties. Groups of less than 6 senators do exist because other political parties lend their senators to other parties in order to allow them to have a parliamentary group.

Cortes Generales
Congress of Deputies (Spain)
Senate of Spain
Parliamentary groups